Eugène Green (born 28 June 1947) is a U.S.-born French film-maker and dramatist. He is notable as an educator, training a generation of young actors in the revival of French baroque theatre technique and declamation.

Films
 2001 : Toutes les nuits; Alexis Loret, Christelle Prot, Adrien Michaux
 2002 : Le nom du feu (short); Christelle Prot et Alexis Loret
 2003 : Le Monde vivant; Christelle Prot, Adrien Michaux, Alexis Loret, Laurène Cheilan, Achille Trocellier, Marin Charvet, seen at the 2004 edition of Bafici
 2004 : Le Pont des Arts; Natacha Régnier, Denis Podalydès, Adrien Michaux, Olivier Gourmet
 2006 : Les signes (short); Christelle Prot, Mathieu Amalric, Achille Trocellier, Marin Charvet
 2007 : Correspondances (short); Delphine Hecquet, François Rivière, Christelle Prot
 2009 : La Religieuse portugaise; Leonor Baldaque, Adrien Michaux
 2014 : La Sapienza; Fabrizio Rongione, Christelle Prot, Ludovico Succio, Arianna Nastro
 2015 : Faire la parole (documentary)
 2016 : Le Fils de Joseph
 2017 : En attendant les barbares
 2020 : Atarrabi et Mikelats

Stage director
various presentations of baroque theatre including:
 Jean Racine: Mithridate at the chapel of the Sorbonne 1999.
 Pierre Corneille: La Suivante 1634 (Avignon, 1993 ; Paris, 1996), Le Cid (Avignon, Paris, 1995), La Place royale ou l'amoureux extravagant (Avignon, Marseille, Paris, 1996).
Opera
 Jean-Philippe Rameau: Castor et Pollux (National Theatre, Prague, 1999).

Actor
 2006 : Les Amitiés maléfiques; :fr:Emmanuel Bourdieu
 Fragments sur la grâce; Vincent Dieutre.

Own plays
 Julien le pauvre
 La Parole dans le jardin
 1995 : Le Rêve dans le petit fer à cheval
 La Pastorale du jardin du Luxembourg
 La Vieille Charité

Spoken word recordings
 1999 : La Conversation: poems of Théophile de Viau with Vincent Dumestre performing works by Robert de Visée on the theorbo
 2001 : La Parole baroque, CD accompanying book. Declamation of Jean de La Fontaine, Le chêne et le roseau ; Torquato Tasso, La mort de Clorinda (La Gerusalemme liberata); Théophile de Viau, La Mort de Pyrame ; William Shakespeare, The Death of Kings (Richard II), To be or not to be (Hamlet); Jacques-Bénigne Bossuet, Qu'est-ce que notre être (excerpt from Sermon sur la mort); Jean Racine, Je ne croiray point? (excerpt from Mithridate).
 2002 : baroque declamation of Sermon sur la mort by Jacques-Bénigne Bossuet at Saint-Étienne-du-Mont.
 2003 : Présences: Essai sur la nature du cinéma (spoken word)
 2007 : baroque declamation of Charles Perrault, six tales from Contes de ma mère l'Oye, Alpha 922.

Non-Fiction
 2001 : La parole baroque
 2004 : Le présent de la parole. Les lieux communs.
 2009 : Poétique du cinématographe
 2010 : La religieuse portugaise
 2011 : La communauté universelle
 2015 : L'Ami du chevalier de Pas, portrait subjectif de Fernando Pessoa

Fiction
 2003 : La rue des Canettes : Cinq contes
 2008 : La Reconstruction
 2009 : La Bataille de Roncevaux
 2012 : Les Atticistes
 2014 : Un conte du Graal
 2015 : L'inconstance des démons

References

External links

1947 births
Living people
French film directors
French male screenwriters
French screenwriters
French male film actors
Lafayette High School (New York City) alumni
Film directors from New York City
Screenwriters from New York (state)
Male actors from New York City
American emigrants to France
Naturalized citizens of France